The Chess Federation of Zambia is the national organization for chess in Zambia. The headquarters are in Lusaka, capital of the country. The president is Mukubulo Chilufya. The vice president is Leslie Chikuse. The Secretary General is Chanda Nsakanya.  The Chess Federation of Zambia is affiliated to the World Chess Federation (FIDE) and to the African Chess Union. It organizes national tournaments such as the National Individual Chess Championships, Zambian Closed Chess Championships and the Zambia Open Chess Championships].

The composition and designation of Zones are as follows:
(a)	Zone 1 – Schools Association 
(b)	Zone 2 – Copperbelt Province Chess League Association
(c)	Zone 3 – Central Province League Association
(d)	Zone 4 – Lusaka Province League Association
(e)	Zone 5 – Southern Province Chess League Association
(f)	Zone 6 – Northern Province Chess League Association
(g)	Zone 7 – North-Western Chess League Association
(h)	Zone 8 – Luapula Province Chess League Association
(i)	Zone 9 – Eastern Province Chess League Association
(j)	Zone 10 - Western Province Chess League Association
(k)	Zone 11 – Muchinga Province Chess League Association

Organisation
President: IO Mukubulo Chilufya
Vice president: NI Leslie ChikuseNase Lungu
Secretary General: IA IO FT Chanda Nsakanya (https://ratings.fide.com/card.phtml?event=8700532) 
Tournaments director: Aaron Banda
 Treasurer: IM FT Andrew Kayonde

See also

List of chess federations

National members of the African Chess Union
Chess in Zambia
Sports governing bodies in Zambia
Chess organizations